Risbecia versicolor is a species of sea slug or dorid nudibranch, a marine gastropod mollusk in the family Chromodorididae.

Distribution

Description

Ecology

References

Chromodorididae
Gastropods described in 1828